El ceniciento is a 1952 Mexican comedy film directed by Gilberto Martínez Solares and starring Germán Valdés, Alicia Caro, and Andrés Soler. It is a retelling of the Cinderella story from a male perspective.

Cast
 Germán Valdésas Valentín Gaytán  
 Alicia Caro as Magdalena  
 Andrés Soler as Andrés  
 Marcelo Chávez as Marcelo  
 Tito Novaro as Marcelito  
 Magda Donato as Sirenia 
 Daniel Arroyo as Invitado a fiesta  
 Jaime Fernández as Anunciador  
 Francisco Reiguera as Inspector celestial  
 Humberto Rodríguez as Jugador de cartas

References

Bibliography 
 Paulo Antonio Paranaguá. Mexican Cinema. British Film Institute, 1995.
 Paul A. Schroeder Rodríguez. Latin American Cinema: A Comparative History. Univ of California Press, 2016.

External links 
 

1952 films
1952 comedy films
Mexican comedy films
1950s Spanish-language films
Films directed by Gilberto Martínez Solares
Mexican black-and-white films
1950s Mexican films